Acetyl-CoA carboxylase 2 also known as ACC-beta or ACC2 is an enzyme that in humans is encoded by the ACACB gene.

Function 

Acetyl-CoA carboxylase (ACC) is a complex multifunctional enzyme system. ACC is a biotin-containing enzyme which catalyzes the carboxylation of acetyl-CoA to malonyl-CoA, the rate-limiting step in fatty acid synthesis. ACC-beta is thought to control fatty acid oxidation by means of the ability of malonyl-CoA to inhibit carnitine palmitoyltransferase I, the rate-limiting step in fatty acid uptake and oxidation by mitochondria. ACC-beta may be involved in the regulation of fatty acid oxidation, rather than fatty acid biosynthesis.

Clinical implications 

Human acetyl-CoA carboxylase has recently become a target in the design of new anti-obesity drugs. However, when the gene for ACC2 was knocked out in mice, no change in body weight was observed relative to normal mice. This result suggests inhibition of ACC2 by drugs may be an ineffective method of treating obesity.

References

Further reading

External links
 

EC 6.4.1
Human proteins